Promises in the Dark may refer to:

 "Promises in the Dark" (song), a song by Pat Benatar
 Promises in the Dark (film), a 1979 American drama film